Whitehorse North Centre was a territorial electoral district in the Canadian territory of Yukon, which was represented on the Yukon Territorial Council from 1974 to 1978 and in the Legislative Assembly of Yukon from 1978 to 1992.

Representatives

References

Former Yukon territorial electoral districts